Qishan may refer to:

Places in China
Qishan County (岐山县), of Baoji, Shaanxi
Qishan, Qimen County (祁山镇), town in Qimen County, Anhui
Qishan, Li County (祁山乡), township in Li County, Gansu
Qishan, Pei County (栖山镇), town in Pei County, Jiangsu
Qishan, Ju County (棋山镇), town in Ju County, Shandong
Qishan, Zhaoyuan (齐山镇), town in Zhaoyuan City, Shandong
Qishan (Hunan) (祁山), mountain in Hunan
Qishan (Gansu) (祁山), mountain in Gansu

Place in Taiwan
Cishan District (Qishan; 旗山區), Kaohsiung, Taiwan

People
Qishan (official) (琦善), Qing Dynasty official